Pichaqani (Aymara pichaqa, phichaqa, piqacha a big needle, -ni a suffix to indicate ownership, "the one with a big needle", also spelled  Pichacani) is a  mountain in the Bolivian Andes. It is situated in the La Paz Department, Loayza Province, Sapahaqui Municipality.

References 

Mountains of La Paz Department (Bolivia)